Alloniscus perconvexus is a species of woodlouse in the family Alloniscidae. It is found in North America.

References

Further reading

 

Woodlice
Articles created by Qbugbot
Crustaceans described in 1856